Circus is the fourth studio album by American rock musician Lenny Kravitz, released in 1995 by Virgin Records. It reached number 10 on the Billboard 200 and number 5 on the UK Albums Chart, becoming Kravitz's first top 10 album in the US and second in the UK.

Background
The album deals with different topics, such as rock star lifestyles on "Rock and Roll Is Dead" and religion on "God Is Love" and "The Resurrection". Kravitz is quoted as saying that the making of the album was a very tedious process—he was unhappy with the music business at the time, and his mother's illness was also weighing on his mind. The recording locations were Chateau Des Conde, France;
Compass Point Studios, Nassau, Bahamas; and Waterfront Studios, Hoboken, NJ.

Reception
Rob Wagner of The Tech stated, "Though Circus is a bit of a rip-off album, it could be justified. Kravitz believes that rock and roll is dead, so he could be trying to revive it by copying past rock and roll songs that worked. Two things are for sure: Circus definitely sounds better than his last album, and it is infinitely better than any inane drivel released by Live. Kravitz avoids the characteristically annoying sound he inflicted on people in Are You Gonna Go My Way. He avoids cheesy '70s style Muzak orchestrations, and, most of the time, he avoids incessantly singing, "Ooooooh!" Mark Kemp of Rolling Stone stated, "Whereas Kravitz's last album at least offered several possible new paths for him, Circus finds him falling back on the most transparent one. Whether it's a calculated attempt to cash in on arena rock while it's all the rage again or an unshakable desire to re-create the 70s-style rock star in his own image is hard to say. What's clear is that Kravitz is not the slick reassembler of funk, R&B, and classic rock that he was two years ago."

Track listing
 "Rock and Roll Is Dead" (Kravitz) – 3:23
 "Circus" (Gerry DeVeaux, Terry Britten, Kravitz) – 4:48
 "Beyond the 7th Sky" (Craig Ross, Kravitz) – 4:54
 "Tunnel Vision" (Kravitz) – 4:19
 "Can't Get You Off My Mind" (Kravitz) – 4:34
 "Magdalene" (Kravitz) – 3:48
 "God Is Love" (Kravitz, Henry Hirsch) – 4:26
 "Thin Ice" (Ross, Kravitz) – 5:33
 "Don't Go and Put a Bullet in Your Head" (Kravitz) – 4:22
 "In My Life Today" (Ross, Kravitz) – 6:29
 "The Resurrection" (Ross, Kravitz) – 4:28
 "Another Life" [Japan bonus] – 3:59

Personnel
Bass by Henry Hirsch for track 3 and Tony Breit for tracks 2
Electric guitar by Craig Ross on tracks 2, 3, 5, 6, 7, 8 and 10
Electric piano by Henry Hirsch on track 11
Mastered by Greg Calbi at Masterdisk
Mixed by David Domanich, Henry Hirsch and Lenny Kravitz
Recorded by Henry Hirsch at Waterfront Studios, NJ; Chateau Des Conde, France and Compass Point Studios, Bahamas
Art direction by Len Peltier
Artwork design by Len Peltier and Steve Gerdes
Photography by Ruven Afanador

Charts and certifications

Weekly charts

Year-end charts

Certifications and sales

References

1995 albums
Lenny Kravitz albums
Virgin Records albums
Albums produced by Lenny Kravitz